Cabri Lake is an endorheic, salt lake in the Canadian province of Saskatchewan. It is located in the south-west region of the province near the border with Alberta in the Rural Municipality of Chesterfield No. 261. Cabri Lake is in the semi-arid Palliser's Triangle and can completely dry up during drought years.

Cabri Lake is within the Mantario Hills (SK 047) Important Bird Area (IBA) of Canada, which is a significant staging area for Canadian geese and nesting area for the ferruginous hawk.

Cabri Lake Effigy 
Cabri Lake is of archeological significance as its shore is the site of the Cabri Lake Effigy – also called the Cabri Lake Stone Man – boulder monument that is believed to represent a shaman.     Tours of the lake and Cabri Hills archeological site are organized by the Archaeological & Historical Society of West-Central Saskatchewan.

See also 
List of lakes of Saskatchewan

References 

Lakes of Saskatchewan
Chesterfield No. 261, Saskatchewan
Important Bird Areas of Saskatchewan
Saline lakes of Canada
Endorheic lakes of Canada